Wasatch County is a county in the U.S. state of Utah. As of the 2010 United States Census, the population was 23,530. Its county seat and largest city is Heber City. The county was named for a Ute Native American word meaning mountain pass or low place in the high mountains.

Wasatch County is part of the Heber, UT Micropolitan Statistical Area as well as the Salt Lake City-Provo-Orem, UT Combined Statistical Area.

History
The first settlers were Mormon pioneers, in 1859, settling near present Heber City, Midway, and Charleston. On January 17, 1862, the Utah Territory legislature created the county, annexing areas from Great Salt Lake, Green River, Sanpete, Summit, and Utah counties. Heber was selected as the county seat.
Wasatch in Ute means "mountain pass" or "low pass over high range". Heber City was named for Mormon Apostle Heber C. Kimball. The county boundaries were altered in 1880 and 1884, and then on January 4, 1915, the eastern portion was partitioned off to become Duchesne County. The Wasatch County boundaries have remained unchanged since 1915.

Geography
Heber Valley has a relatively cool climate since it is mountain-ringed, and over half the land is 7,500 feet (2,286 metres) above sea level. The average annual precipitation is about 16 inches (406 millimetres). The county is divided into two watersheds—the Colorado and the Great Basin drainage systems. Flowing from the East are Daniels, Lake Fork, and Center creeks. From the north and northeast is the Provo River. Flowing from the west is Snake Creek. The county's highest point is the west slope of Murdock Mountain in the Uinta Mountains, at 10,840' (3304m) ASL.

Major highways

 U.S. Route 6
 U.S. Route 40
 U.S. Route 189
 Utah State Route 32
 Utah State Route 35
 Utah State Route 113
 Utah State Route 248
 Utah State Route 319

Adjacent counties
 Salt Lake County - northwest
 Summit County - north
 Duchesne County - east
 Utah County - southwest

Protected areas

 Ashley National Forest (part)
 Currant Creek Campground (USFS)
 Currant Creek Wildlife Management Area (part)
 Deer Creek State Park
 Rock Cliff Campground (Utah State Park)
 Soldier Creek Recreational Area
 Uinta National Forest (part)
 Wasatch Mountain State Park
 Wasatch National Forest (part)
 Wildcat Mountain Wildlife Management Area

Lakes

 Currant Creek Reservoir
 Deer Creek Reservoir
 Jordanelle Reservoir
 Strawberry Reservoir
 Witts Lake

Demographics

2010 census
As of the 2010 United States Census, there were 23,530 people, 4,743 households, and 3,870 families in the county. The population density was 20.0/sqmi (7.73/km2). There were 9,840 (2009) housing units at an average density of 8.37/sqmi (3.23/km2). The racial makeup of the county was 90.4% White, 0.3% Black or African American, 0.5% Native American, 0.8% Asian, 0.1% Pacific Islander, and 1.4% from two or more races. 13.5% of the population were Hispanic or Latino of any race.

There were 7,287 households, out of which 43.1% had children under the age of 18 living with them, 68.70% were married couples living together, 7.4% had a female householder with no husband present, 3.8% had a male householder with no wife present, and 20.1% were non-families. 15.5% of all households were made up of individuals, and 4.8% had someone living alone who was 65 years of age or older. The average household size was 3.18 and the average family size was 3.19.

The county population contained 36.3% under the age of 20, 5.2% from 20 to 24, 28.1% from 25 to 44, 21.9% from 45 to 64, and 8.6% who were 65 years of age or older. The median age was 31.6 years. For every 100 females there were 103.40 males. For every 100 females age 18 and over, there were 101.5 males.

2000 census
As of the 2000 United States Census, the median income for a household in the county was $49,612, and the median income for a family was $52,102. Males had a median income of $37,399 versus $23,571 for females. The per capita income for the county was $19,869. About 4.20% of families and 5.20% of the population were below the poverty line, including 5.60% of those under age 18 and 4.00% of those age 65 or over.

Communities

Cities
 Heber City (county seat)
 Midway
 Park City (part)

Towns

 Charleston
 Daniel
 Hideout
 Independence
 Interlaken
 Wallsburg

Census-designated places
 Timber Lakes

Unincorporated communities

 Center Creek
 Deer Mountain
 Mayflower Mountain
 Soldier Creek Estates
 Soldier Summit
 Wildwood (part)

Former communities

 Hailstone
 Jordanelle
 Keetley

Politics and Government
The county is governed by a seven-member county council with an appointed county manager. 

Wasatch County has traditionally voted Republican. In no national election since 1964 has the county selected the Democratic Party candidate (as of 2020).

Education
All areas of the county are in the Wasatch School District.

See also
 National Register of Historic Places listings in Wasatch County, Utah

References

External links

 

 
1862 establishments in Utah Territory
Populated places established in 1862